The bedrock shiner (Notropis rupestris) is a species of ray-finned fish in the genus Notropis. It is endemic to the United States, where it inhabits the lower Caney Fork system and nearby tributaries of the central Cumberland River drainage in Tennessee.

References 

 Robert Jay Goldstein, Rodney W. Harper, Richard Edwards: American Aquarium Fishes. Texas A&M University Press 2000, p. 93
 

Notropis
Fish described in 1987